Hammer and Anvil is the third full-length album by British progressive rock band Pure Reason Revolution, released by Superball Music on 15 October 2010 in Germany, Austria and Switzerland, 18 October in the rest of Europe, and October 25 in the United States. According to Rock Sound, in Hammer and Anvil, "the band have retained most of their heavy hooks to create a great crossover record. A track like 'Last Man Last Round' will fit into many Pendulum fans' heads, whereas their progressive elements are still prevalent in 'Open Insurrection'". The album was new for the band in that all songs were co-written and co-produced by Tom Bellamy, an ex-member of the band The Cooper Temple Clause. Bellamy has full writing credit for the first track, 'Fight Fire'. Jon Courtney shares credit on all other tracks.

Track listing
"Fight Fire" - 4:29
"Black Mourning" - 5:00
"Patriarch" - 4:18
"Last Man, Last Round" - 4:45
"Valour" - 4:46
"Over The Top" - 4:41
"Never Divide" - 4:48
"Blitzkrieg" - 5:34
"Open Insurrection" - 7:20
"Armistice" - 6:16

References

External links
 PRR MySpace

2010 albums
Pure Reason Revolution albums
Superball Music albums